Jukebox Sparrows is the first full length album by American singer-songwriter Shannon McNally, released in 2002 (see 2002 in music).

Critical reception

Stephen Thomas Erlewine of AllMusic concludes his review by saying, "This is very much a debut -- at times it's hard to not wish it would soar a little higher or shake off the formula of its genre -- but it's a very enjoyable, promising debut from an artist who could turn into something special."

Eden Miller of PopMatters writes, "Even though Jukebox Sparrows makes a couple mistakes along the way, it is an impressive debut that clearly shows the abilities of this powerful singer and songwriter."

Billboard writes, "Produced by Ron Aniello over 11 months at Cello Studios in Los Angeles, "Jukebox Sparrows" reveals itself as a surprisingly confident musical and lyrical offering for such a young songwriter."

The Washington Post's Mark Jenkins writes, "the singer has a taste for country, blues and gospel that would seem incongruous if she didn't boast the sort of voice that could stir a Pentecostal congregation."

Track listing

Personnel
Shannon McNally – vocals, background vocals
Maxi Anderson – background vocals
Ron Aniello – organ, guitar, percussion, electric guitar, mellotron, Farfisa organ, Wurlitzer, toy piano
Joshua Grange – guitars
Alex Brown – background vocals
Paul Bushnell – bass guitar
Lenny Castro – percussion
Matt Chamberlain – drums
Mike Elizondo – bass
Aaron Embry – organ, piano, keyboards
James Gadson – drums
Bob Glaub – bass
Bill Hayes – percussion
Rami Jaffee – keyboards
Jim Keltner – percussion, drums
Greg Kurstin – organ, synthesizer, piano, Wurlitzer
John Leftwich – bass
Greg Leisz – pedal steel, electric guitar, steel guitar, lap steel guitar
Brian McCloud – drums
Bill Payne – organ, piano, Wurlitzer
Walter Rodriguez – percussion
Matt Rollings – organ, piano
Benmont Tench – organ
Waddy Wachtel – guitar
Patrick Warren – keyboards
David Woodford – baritone saxophone

Production
Producer: Ron Aniello
Engineers: Ron Aniello, Neal Avron, Mark Howard, Bob Kearney, Eric Sarafin, Howard Willing
Assistant engineers: Paul Hayden, Billy Kinsley, Mike Scotella
Mixing: Neal Avron, Mark Howard, Jim Scott, Mike Shipley
Mastering: Joe Gastwirt, Ted Jensen
A&R: Watts Russell
Production coordination: Shari Sutcliffe
String samples: Steve Porcaro
Art Direction: Len Peltier
Design: Len Peltier
Artwork: Shannon McNally

References

Shannon McNally albums
2002 albums
Albums produced by Ron Aniello
Capitol Records albums